The 2023 Super W season will be the sixth edition of the competition. The season is expected to kick off on 24 March, with the final to be played on 6 May.

Competition format
Each team will play each other once in a round-robin tournament over five rounds, both Semi-Finals is expected to be played at Concord Oval on 30 April in a doubleheader (Queensland Reds vs. New South Wales Waratahs) with the final to take place on May 6 in Townsville, North Queensland.

Competition

Ladder

Regular season

Round 1

Round 2

Round 3

Round 4

Round 5

Finals

Bracket

Semi-finals

Final

References

2023
2023 in Australian rugby union
2023 in women's rugby union
2023 in Australian women's sport